Dolores is a municipality in the Honduran department of Copán.

History 
The area of Dolores in 1887 was heavily populated, which resembled Santa Rosa de Copan at the time. However, Dolores was not recognized as a municipality until January 1,1920. Dulce Nombre, another municipality in Copán, was created in 1907. Dolores formed as a member of this municipality on April 11,1919 where it stayed until becoming its own municipality.

Villages 
Dolores, Copán is home to the following villages:
 Agua Buena
 Dolores; which is the head of the municipality 
 El Balsamo or La Canteada 
 El Camalote
 Joyas Galanas
 Pasquingal
 Plan del Naranjo
 San Antonio
 Vega Redonda or San Antonio Flores
 Yaruconte

References

Dolores is a pretty town in the mountains (1300 meters) They have an active city government, several churches, a federal police station.  There are several small shops which sell cokes etc. they also have an internet cafe 
There are many pictures on the internet at https://web.archive.org/web/20090106104603/http://www.rader.org/dolores/dolores.htm

Municipalities of the Copán Department